The  is an oil canvas painting by Manipuri artists, M Betombi Singh and Gopal Sharma. The painting shows the capture of powerful Kao bull by hero Khamba. It is one of the most well known museum series "Exhibit of the Month" of the Indira Gandhi Rashtriya Manav Sangrahalaya in India. It was exhibited for a whole month of July, 2019.

Title and subject 
The painting shows an epic legend of Ancient Moirang Kingdom. Angom Nongban Kongyamba, the villain, was jealous of Khuman Khamba, the hero. So, he set a death-trap of Khamba. The hero was asked to capture the giant bull. But Kongyamba's dream of Khamba being killed by the bull was not fulfilled. 
Khamba knew the secrecy of the bull. The bull was once the head of Khamba's father's cattle herd. During the capture, Khamba whispered his father's name to the bull's ear. He also showed a silk rope to the bull. The bull recognised Khamba. So, the wild beast was tamed.

History 
The artwork was painted by late artist M Betombi Singh in the Sana Konung Palace in Imphal, Manipur. The artist was 93 years old when he completed the artwork. In 2001, the painting was registered into the permanent collection of the Indira Gandhi Rashtriya Manav Sangrahalaya Museum. After that, the artwork was visited by many well known people including RK Chaturvedi, AS&FA, Union Ministry of Culture of India. The painting was kept in Veeth Sankul indoor exhibitions and library of the museum.

Exhibition 
In July 2019, the painting was introduced as the "Exhibit of the Month" of the Indira Gandhi Rashtriya Manav Sangrahalayaby RK Chaturvedi, AS&FA, Union Ministry of Culture of India. The exhibition was curated by Nongmaithem Sakamacha. Sakamacha was the Museum Associate of Indira Gandhi Rashtriya Manav Sangrahalaya, Bhopal, India.

Other paintings

See also 
 Poubi Lai

Notes

References

External links 
 

Bullfighting in art
Cattle in art
Cattle in popular culture
Epic cycles of incarnations
Mammals in art
Meitei culture
Meitei folklore in popular culture
Meitei mythology in popular culture
2000s paintings
21st-century paintings